ET41 (also manufactured as HCP 203E) is the name for a Polish electric locomotive used by the Polish railway operator (PKP). Three such locomotives were briefly rented to the Croatian Railways between 1995 and 1996 and were given the designation HŽ series 1081 there.

History
ET41 is a modification of the EU07 locomotive, and was designed for the purpose of heavy transport. It is made of two connected bodies of EU07, minus the cabs at the inner ends.

Introduction
The design for this machine was ready in 1976. Basically it consists of two EU07 locomotives but with two driver's cabs removed. Two locos are semi-permanently coupled in multiple operation. Because of this, the current collection must be done independently for each section.

Production
Production started in 1977 and continued until 1983. A total number of 200 double-locomotives were produced.

Notable events
For some time number 100 carried a special white-red livery and was used on the special PZPR (Polish communist party) trains.

Half-locomotives 036B, 088A and 116A have been rebuilt as PKP EU07-537, EU07-544 and PKP EU07-545 respectively. This has required cabs to be built at the back end.

Present day
ET41 are mainly used for coal transport from Upper Silesia to the ports of Gdańsk, Gdynia and Szczecin. Seldom are those locomotives used for hauling passenger trains. In 2016, PKP Cargo decided to send some of ET41 locomotives for major repair and modernization to Ostrów Wielkopolski. Electric part, bogies and traction engines were modernized. Driver cabs were rebuilt, reducing the noise level in the cab.

See also
Polish locomotives designation

References

External links 
Modern Locos Gallery
Rail Service
Mikoleje
Chabówka Rail Museum

3000 V DC locomotives
Bo′Bo′+Bo′Bo′ locomotives
Polish State Railways electric locomotives
Standard gauge locomotives of Poland